Maxwell Stuart Thompson (born 31 December 1956) is an English former footballer. A defender, he scored eight goals in 137 league games in a ten-year career in the Football League. At age 17 years and 128 days, he became Liverpool's youngest ever player (his record has since been broken) when he made his debut in May 1974. He joined Blackpool three years later, and went on to play 99 league games for the club in a four-year spell, and was also loaned out to the Dallas Tornado and Seattle Sounders. He then spent the 1980s with various clubs across the world: AFC Bournemouth, Port Vale, Baltimore Blast (USA), Académica de Coimbra (Portugal), Northwich Victoria, Caernarfon Town, Fleetwood, Newport County, Kramfors (Sweden), and Southport. He later worked at Anfield as a physiotherapist.

Career
Thompson started his career with Liverpool and broke the club record for being the youngest player to appear for Liverpool, when Bill Shankly handed him his First Division debut at the end of the 1973–74 season against Tottenham Hotspur on 8 May 1974, at the age of 17 years and 128 days. His record was broken by Jack Robinson, who made his debut for Liverpool at the age of 16. Thompson was on the substitutes bench at Wembley in the 1974 FA Charity Shield victory over Leeds United. He never made it onto the pitch though for another league appearance under Bob Paisley in the 1974–75, 1975–76, and 1977–78 campaigns.

He was sold on to Allan Brown's Blackpool for a £80,000 fee in December 1977. The "Tangerines" were relegated out of the Second Division at the end of the 1977–78 season. New boss Bob Stokoe took them to 12th in the Third Division in 1978–79, before they ended the 1979–80 season in 18th place under Alan Ball's stewardship. The club in turmoil, Allan Brown returned to the hot-seat and took them down to the Fourth Division in 1980–81. Thompson scored six goals in 99 league games during his time at Bloomfield Road. During his time at the club he also spent the 1977 and 1978 summers in the North American Soccer League with Dallas Tornado, and also spent the summer of 1980 with the Seattle Sounders.

He signed with Swansea City, and helped John Toshack's "Swans" defy expectations with a sixth-place finish in the top-flight in 1981–82. However they did suffer relegation at the end of the 1982–83 campaign. Thompson scored twice in 26 league games at Vetch Field. He then played nine Third Division games for AFC Bournemouth in a brief stay at Dean Court. He joined John McGrath's Port Vale on loan in November 1983, but played just two Third Division games for the "Valiants".

He later played for American Major Indoor Soccer League side Baltimore Blast, Portuguese Académica de Coimbra, Conference club Northwich Victoria, Northern Premier League side Caernarfon Town, Fleetwood, Newport County, Swedish Kramfors, and Southport.

Post-retirement
Thompson became the manager of Knowsley United before becoming the physiotherapist at Liverpool and then Southport.

Career statistics
Source:

Honours
Liverpool
FA Charity Shield: 1974

References

1956 births
Living people
Footballers from Liverpool
English footballers
Association football defenders
Liverpool F.C. players
Blackpool F.C. players
English expatriate footballers
Expatriate soccer players in the United States
English expatriate sportspeople in the United States
Dallas Tornado players
Seattle Sounders (1974–1983) players
Swansea City A.F.C. players
AFC Bournemouth players
Port Vale F.C. players
Baltimore Blast (1980–1992) players
Expatriate footballers in Portugal
Associação Académica de Coimbra – O.A.F. players
Northwich Victoria F.C. players
Caernarfon Town F.C. players
Fleetwood Town F.C. players
Newport County A.F.C. players
Kramfors-Alliansen Fotboll players
Southport F.C. players
Expatriate footballers in Sweden
English Football League players
North American Soccer League (1968–1984) players
Major Indoor Soccer League (1978–1992) players
National League (English football) players
Northern Premier League players
English football managers
Association football physiotherapists
Liverpool F.C. non-playing staff
Southport F.C. non-playing staff